Heteromurus nitidus is a species of slender springtails in the family Entomobryidae.

References

External links

 

Collembola
Articles created by Qbugbot
Animals described in 1835